Hum TV is a commercial broadcast television network owned by Hum Entertainment Television. Headquartered on I. I. Chundrigar Road in Karachi, the network is one of the major channels in Pakistan in terms of viewership. The following is a list of all television programming that the network has broadcast since it began its TV operations in January 2005.

Current programming

Note: Titles are listed in alphabetical order.

Political 
Meri Shehzadi

Comedy 
Kaala Doriya
Pyari Mona

Romance 
Agar
Tinkay Ka Sahara
 Yunhi

Tragedy 
Mere Damaad
Meesni

Social issue 
Kacha Dhaga 
Mere Ban Jao

Upcoming programming 
 Mohabbat Ek Saza

Former programming

Anthology series

 Choti Choti Batain
 Kitni Girhain Baqi Hain
 Kitni Girhain Baqi Hain! Phir Se
 Shareek-e-Hayat
 Sasural Ke Rang Anokhay
 Ustani Jee

Horror or supernatural series

 Belapur Ki Dayan
 Chalawa
 Mehboob Aapke Qadmon Main
 Woh
 Woh Dubara

Comedy series 

 Bus Yunhi
 Coke Kahani
 Couples
 Chand Pe Dastak
 Chupke Chupke
 Dramay Baziyan
 Dhol Bajnay Laga
  Extras - The Mango People
 Fun Khana
 Halka Na Lo
Hum Tum
 Jadugaryan
 Joru Ka Ghulam
 Love ke liye
 Mannchalay
 Mahi Aye Ga
 Mithu Aur Aapa
 Mohabbat Jaye Bhar Mein
 Mr. Shamim
 Namak Paray
 One Way Ticket
Paristan
 Phir Chand Pe Dastak
 Raju Rocket
 Resham Gali Ki Husna
 Suno Chanda
 Suno Chanda 2
 Tanaa Banaa
 Uff Meri Family
 Zerooos

Drama series

 Aahista Aahista
 Aakhir Kab Tak
 Aangan
 Aashti
 Aatish
 Abro
 Adhi Gawahi
 Aik Pal
 Aik Thi Misaal
 Aisay Jalay Jiya
 Aitebaar
 Akbari Asghari
 Akhri Barish
 Alif Allah Aur Insaan
 Alvida
 Anaa
 Aseerzadi
 Aye Zindagi
 Baandi
 Badi Aapa
Badshah Begum
Bakhtawar 
 Band Khirkiyan
Bebaak
Bebasi
 Be Adab
 Bharam
Bikhray Hain Hum
 Bilqees Kaur
 Bin Roye
 Bisaat
 Bisaat e Dil
 Bunty I Love You
 Chaudween Ka Chand
 Choti Si Zindagi
 Daasi
 Daldal
 Dar Si Jati Hai Sila
 Dastaan
 Dayar-e-Dil
 Deewana
 Deewar-e-Shab
 De Ijazat
 De Ijazat Jo Tu
 Dharkan
 Dil Banjaara
 Dil Ruba
 Digest Writer
 Dil-e-Beqarar
 Dil-e-Jaanam
 Dil-e-Muztar
 Dil Ka Kia Rung Karun
 Dil Tanha Tanha
 Dobara
 Do Saal Ki Aurat
 Dulhan
 Durr-e-Shahwar
 Ehd-e-Wafa
 Ek Tamanna Lahasil Si
 Firaaq
 Gul-e-Rana
 Gumrah
 Hasrat
 Hatheli
 Humnasheen
 Humsafar
Hum Kahan Ke Sachay Thay
 Ibn-e-Hawwa
 Inkaar
Ishq E Laa
 Ishq Gumshuda
 Ishq Junoon Deewangi
 Ishq Mein Teray
 Ishq Tamasha
 Ishq Zahe Naseeb
 Izteraab
 Jaal
Janam Jali
 Jhoot
 Jia Na Jaye
 Jo Tu Chahey
Juda Huway Kuch Is Tarhan
 Jugnoo
 Kaali Ghatain
 Kadoorat
 Kahani Raima Aur Manahil Ki
 Kahi Unkahi
 Kaisay Tum Se Kahoon
 Kaisi Aurat Hoon Main
 Kankar
 Karb
 Kashf
 Kathputli
 Khaas
 Khamoshi
 Khamoshiyan
 Khoya Khoya Chand
 Khwab Saraye
 Ki Jaana Main Kaun
 Kisay Apna Kahein
 Kisay Chahoon
 Kitna Satatay Ho 
 Kuch Na Kaho
 Laa
 Laaj
Laapata
 Lagaao
 Lamhay
 Maan
 Maana Ka Gharana
 Maat
 Madiha Maliha
 Mah-e-Tamaam
 Main Abdul Qadir Hoon
 Main Haar Nahi Manoun Gi
 Main Maa Nahi Banna Chahti
 Main Khayal Hoon Kisi Aur Ka
 Malaal
 Malaal e Yaar
 Manay Na Ye Dil
 Mann Mayal 
 Man-o-Salwa
 Maseeha
 Mastana Mahi
 Mata-e-Jaan Hai Tu
 Mausam
 Meer Abru
 Mehar Bano aur Shah Bano
 Mehram
 Mein Na Janoo
 Mera Naseeb
 Meray Dard Ko Jo Zuban Miley
 Meray Qatil Meray Dildar
 Meray Meherbaan
 Mere Humdam
Mere Paas Paas
 Mohabbat Aag Si
Mohabbat Karne Walon Kay Naam
 Mohabbat Khawab Safar
 Mohabbat Rooth Jaye Toh
 Mohabbat Subh Ka Sitara Hai
 Mohabbat Tujhe Alvida
 Mohabbatain Chahatain
 Mol
 Mujhe Apna Bana Lo
 Mujhe Hai Hukm e Azaan
 Mujhe Khuda Pe Yaqeen Hai
 Muqaddas
 Mushk
 Na Kaho Tum Mere Nahi
 Nadamat
 Naqab Zan
 Natak
 Nazr-e-Bad
 Neelam Kinaray
 Nehar
 Nikah
 Noor Bano
 Noor Pur Ki Rani
 O Rangreza
 Pagli
 Pakeeza
 Pani Jaisa Piyar
 Parchayee
Parizaad
 Parsa
 Pehchaan
Phaans
 Phir Wohi Mohabbat
 Preet Na Kariyo Koi 
 Pyar Ke Sadqay
 Qaid-e-Tanhai
 Qarar
 Qismat
Qissa Meherbano Ka
 Qurbatein
 Rabba Mainu Maaf Kareen
 Ranjha Ranjha Kardi
Raqeeb Se
 Raqs-e-Bismil
 Rehaai
 Rishtay Kuch Adhooray Se
Roag
 Roshan Sitara
 Ru Baru
 Sabaat
 Sadqay Tumhare
Safar Tamam Howa
 Sammi
 Sanam
 Sangat
 Sang-e-Mah
 Sang-e-Mar Mar
 Sanjha
 Saraab
 Sawaab
 Saya-e-Dewar Bhi Nahi
 Sehra Main Safar
 Shab-e-Gham
 Shab-e-Zindagi
 Shanakht
 Shehr-e-Zaat
 Sila
Sila-e-Mohabbat
 Sitamgar
 Tabeer
 Tajdeed e Wafa
 Tanhai
 Tarap
 Tawaan
 Tera Ghum Aur Hum
 Tera Yahan Koi Nahin
 Tere Baghair
 Tere Jaane Ke Baad
 Tere Mere Beech
 Teri Meri Kahani
The Ghost
 Toh Dil Ka Kia Hua
 Tu Ishq Hai
 Tum Jo Miley
Tum Ho Wajah
 Tum Mere Paas Raho
 Tum Se Kahna Tha
 Tumhari Marium
 Tumhari Natasha 
 Tumhare Siwa  
 Udaari
 Ullu Baraye Farokht Nahi
 Vasl
Wabaal
Wehshi
 Wehem
 Woh Aik Pal
 Yahan Pyar Nahin Hai
 Yaqeen Ka Safar
 Yeh Raha Dil
 Yeh Dil Mera
Yun Tu Hai Pyar Bohut
 Zara Yaad Kar
 Zard Mausam
 Zebaish
 Zid
 Zindagi Gulzar Hai
 Zun Mureed

Miniseries
Bhook
 Khaab Toot Jaatay Hain
Mohabbat.PK

Soap operas

Aasi
 Agar Tum Na Hotay
 Ahmed Habib Ki Betiyan
 Aik Larki Aam Si
 Akeli
 Aks
Ant Ul Hayat
 Bad Gumaan
Badnaseeb
 Baityaan
 Be Aitbaar
Bebaak
Bepanah
Beqadar
 Bhool
 Bhool Ja Aye Dil
 Bichoo
 Bin Tere
Chamak Damak
 Choti Si Ghalat Fehmi
 Chubhan
 Darbadar Tere Liye
 Dil, Diya, Dehleez
 Gila
 Haya Ke Daaman Main
 Hum Tehray Gunahgaar
 Ishq-e-Benaam
 Ishq Hamari Galiyon Mein
 Ishq Ibadat
 Jethaani
 Khatti Meethi Zindagi
 Khwaab Ankhain Khwahish Chehre
 Kissey Apna Kahein
 Log Kia Kahengay
 Maa Sadqey
Main Khwab Bunti Houn
 Mar Jain Bhi To Kya
 Mein Hari Piya
 Mera Bhi Koi Ghar Hota
 Mera Dard Na Janay Koi
 Mere Khwab Raiza Raiza
 Mere Khuda
 Mujhay Roothnay Na Daina
 Mujhay Sandal Kar Do
 Mohabbat Mushkil Hai
 Naseebon Jali
 Nalaiq
 Nikhar Gaye Gulab Sare
 Palki
 Soya Mera Naseeb
 Saiqa
 Sangsar
 Sanwari
 Sartaj Mera Tu Raaj Mera
 Sitam
Soteli Maamta
 Susraal Mera
 Thori Si Wafa
Wafa Be Mol
 Wafa Kar Chalay
Yaar Na Bichray
 Zindagi Tujh Ko Jiya

Reality/non-scripted

 60 Hours to Glory
 Amazing Nordics
 Coke Studio
 Guest Corner
 Hum 2 Humara Show
 Hero Ya Zero
 Jago Pakistan Jago
 Jeet Ka Dum
 Maachis
 Morning with Hum
 Nescafe Basement
 Battle of the Bands
 The After Moon Show Series
 The After Moon Show
  The After Moon Show Season 2
 Tonite with HSY
 TUC - The Lighter Side of Life
 Uth Records
 Veet Miss Super Model
 Wonderful Indonesia
 Zindagi 360 (VOA)

Telefilms

2 Batta 8
92/93 Ki Shadi
Anokhay Raqeeb
Afrah Tafreeh
Breakup Ke Baad
Bhagat
Bakra In Law
Bakra Impossible
Bahu Rani Saas Siyani
Baanway Tiraanway Ki Shaadi
Beti Hi To Hai
Bholay Bhalay Sayan
Balay Ki Balli
 Bayhadh
 Band Toh Baje Ga
 Chal Dil Mere
 Dr.Balma
 Dildariyan
 Dilnaz Naseeb Wali
 Dil Ka Chor
 Dil Diyan Gallan
Daady
 Ek Chance Pyar Ka
 Glass Tora Bara Aana
 Ghapla
 Hona Tha Pyaar
 Iss Dil Ki Essi Ki Tessi
Jeena Hai Mushkil
 Kahin Chand Na Sharma Jaye
 Left Right Left
 Lucknow Wale Lateefullah
Lucky Kabootar
Laddu Ki Lady
Mera Ishrat Meri Marzi
 Made For China
 Main Kukkoo Aur woh
 Mutthi Bhar Mitti
 Nain Taara
 Pinky Ka Dulha
 Pyaar Kahani
 Pyare Ko Pyar Nahi Mila
 Princpal Nadra 19
 Roop
 Raja Ki Chandni
 Shadi Aur Tum Say?
 Sheikh Sahab Chal Basay
 Subah Be Daagh Hai
Teen Shoqeen
Tujhe Chun Liya
Vespa Girl
Yaad

Awards shows

 Hum Awards
 Hum Style Awards

Acquired Programming
Jhalak Dikhhla Jaa
Just Dance
Junoon Tere Pyaar Ka
Simi Selects India's Most Desirable

See also
 List of programs broadcast by Geo TV
 List of programs broadcast by ARY Digital

References

External links

 
 Schedule of Hum TV programs

Hum TV
Hum TV
Hum TV